The Singapore Wind Symphony's Percussion Ensemble (SWSPE) is an affiliation of the Singapore Wind Symphony (SWS). The ensemble is based in Singapore and is made up of both professional and amateur musicians.

History 
The Singapore Wind Symphony's Percussion Ensemble was initiated and formed by Mr Willy Tan, timpanist from the Singapore Wind Symphony. Prior to his current appointment as leader of the ensemble, he has also taken the role of conductor from 2004 to 2006.

Members of the ensemble gather from a range of professions -  professional musicians and educators, executives, national servicemen, college and tertiary students.

Since its inception in 2004, the SWSPE has held numerous public performances titled "Percussive Elementz", held twice a year. At its inaugural performance, the ensemble was honoured to have internationally renowned percussionist, Mr Tama Goh, as a guest soloist.

In 2005, the ensemble made her debut at the internationally acclaimed band competition, the 15th World Music Contest, (WMC) held in Kerkrade, Netherlands. The ensemble took part in The Percussion Ensemble Competition - Concert Division, and clinched the Silver award. This year also marked the introduction of such a division.

Guest Artistes 

Guests who have performed with the SWSPE:

Mr Tama Goh, Professional Musician, Endorsee for  Zildjian Cymbals & Pearl Drums

Ms Kae Hashimoto, Marimbist and Lecturer at Mahidol University's College of Music

Mr Pan Huei Yuan, currently pursuing a Masters of Music (Percussion Performance) and Literature at the Northwestern University, USA. He is also a percussion instructor with the Northwestern University Wildcat Marching Band (NUMB)

Repertoire 
The SWSPE has been exploring a diverse range of repertoire, those that have been performed by the ensemble are listed in the table below.

Percussion ensembles